is a leading UK company law decision of the UK Supreme Court concerning the nature of the doctrine of piercing the corporate veil, resulting trusts and equitable proprietary remedies in the context of English family law.

Facts
Ms Yasmin Prest claimed under Matrimonial Causes Act 1973 sections 23 and 24 for ancillary relief against the offshore companies solely owned by Mr Michael Prest. Mrs Prest said they held legal title to properties that he beneficially owned, including a £4m house at 16 Warwick Avenue, London. They had married in 1993 and divorced in 2008. He did not comply with orders for full and frank disclosure of his financial position, and the companies did not file a defence. The Matrimonial Causes Act 1973 section 24 required that for a court to be able to order a transfer a property, Mr Prest had to be ‘entitled’ to the properties held by his companies. Mr Prest contended that he was not entitled to the properties.

Judgment

High Court
Moylan J, in the Family Division of the High Court, held that Mr Prest had the ability to transfer the properties in practice, so he was “entitled” to them under MCA 1973 s 24(1)(a). The court therefore had jurisdiction to make a transfer order. He ordered Mr Prest to transfer to the wife six properties and an interest in a seventh which were held in the name of two of the husband’s companies. He rejected the husband had done anything improper relating to the companies to allow piercing the corporate veil. But under MCA 1973 s 24(1)(a) ancillary relief was wider. Because Mr Prest’s properties were worth £37.5 million, Mrs Prest’s fair award was valued at £17.5m. In reviewing the law as it relates to piercing the corporate veil, he noted the following principles:

 Ownership and control were not in themselves sufficient to pierce the corporate veil.
 Even where there was no unconnected third party interest the veil could not be pierced only because it is necessary in the interests of justice.
 The veil can only be pierced if there is impropriety.
 The impropriety must be linked to the use of the company structure to avoid or conceal liability.
 In order to pierce the veil, both control by the wrongdoer and impropriety must be demonstrated.
 A company may be a façade even though originally incorporated without deceptive intent.

In that regard, he found that piercing was justified, not under the general principles, but by virtue of the Act. The husband's properties were worth approximately £37.5 million, and therefore the wife's fair award was valued at £17.5 million.

Court of Appeal
The Court of Appeal, with Rimer LJ and Patten LJ in the majority, allowed an appeal by the companies. The Family Division’s practice of treating the assets of companies substantially owned by one party to the marriage as available for distribution under MCA 1973 section 24(1)(a) was beyond the jurisdiction of the court unless the corporate personality of the company was being abused. The corporate form needed to be used for an improper purpose, or it had to be shown that the companies held the properties on trust for Mr Prest. Because Munby J had rejected these possibilities in Ben Hashem v Al Shayif his order must have been incorrect. In the majority's view, this conflicted with Salomon v A Salomon & Co Ltd, as affirmed in Woolfson v Strathclyde Regional Council and Adams v Cape Industries plc. Patten LJ commented on other Family Division cases leading to similar results.

Thorpe LJ (a former judge of the Family Division) dissented, and said the following.

Supreme Court
The Supreme Court unanimously overturned the Court of Appeal and held that Mr Prest beneficially owned the assets of the Petrodel Resources Ltd companies under a resulting trust because he contributed to their purchase price. There was no need to pierce the corporate veil, which could only be done in limited situations. However, because Mr Prest had been "entitled" to the assets of his companies under a resulting trust, under the Matrimonial Causes Act 1973 section 24 the court had jurisdiction to transfer half the value of the properties to Mrs Prest.

Lord Sumption gave the first judgment. He said there was only a limited power to pierce the corporate veil, namely when people were under an existing legal obligation which is deliberately evaded. Fraud cuts through everything. A veil could be pierced only for the purpose of depriving the company or its controller of the advantage they would otherwise obtain from the company’s separate legal personality. There had been no evidence that Mr Prest had set up the companies to avoid any obligations in these divorce proceedings, so there was no ground for piercing the corporate veil. The same was true under the MCA 1973 s 24. This did invoke property concepts with established meanings, and did not mean something different in matrimonial proceedings. If someone did try to frustrate a claim, the MCA 1973 section 37 made provision for setting aside certain dispositions. The jurisdiction that Munby J purported to recognise would, however, cut across the statutory schemes of company and insolvency law that protected people dealing with a company. So, MCA 1973 section 24 did not give judges power to order Mr Prest to transfer property that he was not entitled to in law. However, on the facts, the Petrodel Resources Ltd companies could be ordered to transfer the properties under MCA 1973 section 24 because they belonged to him beneficially: under a resulting trust. The evidence was obscure, but this was because of Mr Prest’s obstruction and mendacity. He said the following.

Lord Neuberger emphasised that piercing the corporate veil should be the last resort. He noted that in other Commonwealth countries there was also little consensus. In Australia, "there is no common, unifying principle, which underlies the occasional decision of courts to pierce the corporate veil", and that "there is no principled approach to be derived from the authorities". In Canada, "[t]he law on when a court may … '[lift] the corporate veil' … follows no consistent principle". In New Zealand, "'to lift the corporate veil' … is not a principle. It describes the process, but provides no guidance as to when it can be used." In South Africa, "[t]he law is far from settled with regard to the circumstances in which it would be permissible to pierce the corporate veil". Similar confusion was also noted in US corporate law and in academic reviews. In conclusion he said the following.

Lady Hale gave a judgment concurring in the result, with which Lord Wilson agreed, though added a qualification to Lord Sumption's decision.

Lord Mance emphasised that future possible situations where the veil could be pierced should not be foreclosed.

Lord Clarke concurred. He agreed that Munby J in Ben Hashem v Al Shayif was correct that the veil could only be pierced where all other possibilities were exhausted. Also as he said in VTB Capital plc v Nutritek International Corp it is wrong to foreclose all future possibilities of piercing the veil.

Lord Walker said he welcomed "the full discussion in the judgments of Lord Neuberger, Lady Hale, Lord Mance and Lord Sumption" and concluded with the following.

Significance
The significance of Prest was that it suggested that piercing the veil was usually a last resort, and that remedies outside of "piercing" the veil, particularly in equity, or the law of tort, could achieve appropriate results on the facts of each case. The metaphor of piercing was thought to be unhelpful by most of the judges in the Supreme Court.

See also

UK company law
English family law
Piercing the corporate veil

Notes

References

United Kingdom company case law
Supreme Court of the United Kingdom cases
2013 in case law
2013 in British law
United Kingdom corporate personality case law
Corporate case law